Yasemin Dalkılıç (born 2 May 1979) is a Turkish female free diver. She holds numerous records in different categories of free diving. Though still in the middle of her career, she is already considered to be one of the all-time greats in the sport.

Biography
At age 14, she was a member of the national monofin finswimming team, where she stayed for several years and set several Turkish records. By the time she was 16, she had established herself as the best freediver in her country. In 1996, she started as a student in the mathematics department at the Middle East Technical University in Ankara, where she became a member of the Subaqua Society.

In 1998 Dalkılıç competed in the Freediving World Cup in Sardinia, Italy, where she clinched the first place among the women. A year later, in 1999, Yasemin made an acquaintance that would change her life. International trainer Rudi Castineyra, who would guide world champions Alejandro Ravelo, Tanya Streeter and David Lee to several world records, showed great interest in her.

Yasemin started a training regime designed by Rudi Castineyra. In 2000 the duo set their sights on variable ballast freediving, which comprises two categories. On 19 and 23 July Dalkılıç beat the existing world records in the limited and unlimited variable ballast categories by reaching  and  respectively.

In 2001, she set two more world records.

Records 

Unassisted Constant Ballast 40 m, 1:56 min WR on 22 October 2001 in Kardamena, on the island                                        of Kaş, Antalya, Turkey
Limited Variable Ballast 105 m, 2:38 min WR on 15 July 2001 in Hurghada by the Island of Abu Ramada in the Red Sea, Egypt
Unlimited Variable Ballast 120 m  WR on 23 July 2000 in Bodrum, Turkey
Limited Variable Ballast 100 m  2:22 min WR on 19 July 2000 in Bodrum
Limited Variable Ballast 96 m  2:22 min WR on 14 July 2000 in Bodrum
Equipment Assisted Constant Ballast 68 m  2:27 min WR on 7 November 1999

See also
 Turkish women in sports

References 

1979 births
Living people
Middle East Technical University alumni
Sportspeople from Ankara
Turkish freedivers
Turkish sportswomen